Dwaarkill (also known as Dwaars Kill, Dwaar's Kill, or Dwaar Kill) is a populated place in Ulster County, New York, United States.

See also
Crawford, New York

References

Hamlets in Ulster County, New York